Aliabad-e Musehli (also Romanized as ‘Alīābād-e Mūsehlī; also known as ‘Alīābād) is a village in Dadin Rural District, Jereh and Baladeh District, Kazerun County, Fars Province, Iran. At the 2006 census, its population was 508, in 105 families.

References 

Populated places in Kazerun County